, or the Shrine in the Country,  is a Shinto shrine in the Arashiyama district on the west side of the city of Kyoto in Kyoto prefecture, Japan, close to its bamboo forest.  The specific site of the shrine changed somewhat over time, as the location of the shrine was fixed anew by divination when a new imperial priestess was to undergo purification before traveling to take up her duties at Ise Shrine.

Saigu procession
In the Heian period, successive imperial princesses stayed in the Nonomiya Shrine for a year or more to purify themselves before becoming representatives of the imperial family at the Ise Shrine in Mie prefecture.  Contemporary annual processions recreate a scene from a picture scroll of the imperial court during the Heian period, starting from the shrine and continuing as far as the Togetsu-kyo Bridge, Arashiyama.

In literature

Nonomiya Shrine appears in the tenth chapter of the Tale of Genji.	

There are many plays and other works which are based on the narrative of Genji. In the Noh play, The Shrine in the Fields by Zeami, a scene features a priest praying when a girl enters; and, upon questioning, she tells the story of how,
when Lady Rokujo was staying at Nonomiya with her daughter who had been appointed as the Ise virgin, Genji came to her.

Notes

See also
 List of Shinto shrines in Kyoto

References
 Kawabata, Yasunari. (2006).  The Old Capital. 	Emeryville, California: Shoemaker & Hoard Publishers.  
 Ponsonby-Fane, Richard Arthur Brabazon. (1934).  Kamo Mioya Shrine.  Kobe: J. L. Thompson & Co.  OCLC 6045058
 Tyler, Royall. (1992).  Japanese Nō Dramas. London:  Penguin Classics.  
 Varley, H. Paul. (2000).  Japanese Culture. Honolulu: University of Hawaii Press.

External links

1st-millennium establishments in Japan
Shinto shrines in Kyoto
Religious organizations established in the 9th century
Saigū